Erigeron socorrensis is a Mexican species of flowering plant in the family Asteraceae known by the common name Socorro Island fleabane. It has been found only on Socorro Island in Mexico, part of the State of Colima.

One plant can produce several groups of small flower heads, each group at the end of a long, thin stalk.

References

External links
Photo of specimen at the Missouri Botanical Garden, collected on Socorro Island in 1897, isotype of Erigeron socorrensis

socorrensis
Flora of Colima
Flora of Mexican Pacific Islands
Islands of Colima
Plants described in 1899